Sakar Peak is a peak of elevation 355 m in Vidin Heights on Varna Peninsula, Livingston Island in the South Shetland Islands, Antarctica.  Partly ice-free southeast slopes.  Surmounting Panega Glacier to the north and east, and the lower course of Kaliakra Glacier to the south.

The peak is named after Sakar Mountain in southeastern Bulgaria.

Location

Maps
 L.L. Ivanov et al. Antarctica: Livingston Island and Greenwich Island, South Shetland Islands. Scale 1:100000 topographic map. Sofia: Antarctic Place-names Commission of Bulgaria, 2005.
 L.L. Ivanov. Antarctica: Livingston Island and Greenwich, Robert, Snow and Smith Islands. Scale 1:120000 topographic map.  Troyan: Manfred Wörner Foundation, 2009.

References
 Sakar Peak. SCAR Composite Antarctic Gazetteer
 Bulgarian Antarctic Gazetteer. Antarctic Place-names Commission. (details in Bulgarian, basic data in English)

External links
 Sakar Peak. Copernix satellite image

Mountains of Livingston Island